Zhangixalus suffry is a species of flying frog first described to science in 2007. It is endemic to the eastern Himalayas.

References

suffry
Amphibians described in 2007